The 2018 Pro Bowl was the National Football League's all-star game for the 2017 season, which was played at Camping World Stadium in Orlando, Florida on January 28, 2018. For the first time since 2009, the game started during afternoon hours instead of primetime hours for U.S. Mainland viewers with a 3 p.m. ET start. It marked the second year the game was played in Orlando. It was televised nationally by ESPN and simulcasted on ABC. The roster was announced on December 19 on NFL Network. The AFC team won the game 24–23, the second straight year the Pro Bowl was won by the AFC.

Background

Host selection process 
Under a three-year deal that began in 2017, the Pro Bowl will once again be hosted by Camping World Stadium in Orlando.

Side events
The Pro Bowl Skills Challenge was held on January 25 at the Walt Disney World Resort and its ESPN Wide World of Sports Complex.

Game format

Rule changes
The game format was the same as for 2017, highlighted by:
Forty-four players were assigned to each team, up from 43 in 2016 (a regular game-day active roster has 46).
The two-minute warning that was given in the first and third quarters (in addition to the second and fourth quarters) in previous years was eliminated, and the ball did not change hands after the first and third quarters.
The coin toss determined which team was awarded possession first. There were no kickoffs; the ball was placed on the 25-yard line at the start of each half and after scoring plays.
Defenses were now permitted to play cover two and press coverage. Prior to 2014, only man coverage was allowed, except for goal line situations.
A 38-second/25-second play clock was used instead of the usual 40-second/25-second clock, and up from 35-second/25-second clock in 2016.
Replay reviews will be allowed; previously there was replay in the Pro Bowl only when new equipment tests were being conducted.
There are no intentional grounding rules.
Only defensive ends and tackles may rush on passing plays, but those must be on the same side of the ball. The defense is not permitted to blitz.
All blindside blocks and blocks below the waist are illegal.
A tight end and running back must be in every formation.
No more than two wide receivers on either side of the ball.
Deep middle safety must be aligned inside the hash marks.
Play is stopped the moment a defender wraps his arms around the ball carrier. (This rule only applies to the quarterback in the backfield during regular NFL play.)

Summary

Box score

AFC rosters
The following players were selected to represent the AFC:

Offense

Defense

Special teams

NFC rosters
The following players were selected to represent the NFC:

Offense

Defense

Special teams

Notes:
Players must have accepted their invitations as alternates to be listed; those who declined are not considered Pro Bowlers.

bold player who participated in game
 signifies the player has been selected as a captain
Replacement Player selection due to injury or vacancy
Injured/suspended player; selected but did not participate
Replacement starter; selected as reserve
Selected but did not play because his team advanced to Super Bowl LII (see Pro Bowl "Player Selection" section)

Number of selections per team

Broadcasting
The 2018 Pro Bowl was televised nationally by ABC, ESPN, and ESPN Deportes. The simulcast marked the game's return to broadcast television, as well as its return to ABC for the first time since 2003. To accommodate the return to broadcast television, the game moved from primetime to an afternoon start time to avoid interfering with ABC's Primetime Lineup.

Cheerleaders 
All selected in a different way, some by fan vote, some by team vote and some by choice of their director, the 2018 Pro Bowl Cheerleaders were a team composed of only one representative from each NFL team. This elite group of women attended events, performed for fans, and learned new routines all throughout the week leading up to the game. The team performed for the entirety of the game and in the half-time routine with Jordan Fisher.

References

External links
Official website

2018
2017 National Football League season
2018 in American football
2018 in sports in Florida
2010s in Orlando, Florida
American football in Orlando, Florida
January 2018 sports events in the United States
Sports competitions in Orlando, Florida
Simulcasts